The 2019 Minnesota Twins season  was the 59th season for the Minnesota Twins franchise in the Twin Cities of Minnesota, their 10th season at Target Field and the 119th overall in the American League.  It was the first year under new manager Rocco Baldelli who was hired on October 25, 2018 following the firing of previous manager Paul Molitor on October 2.  It was also the first season since 2004 without longtime Twin Joe Mauer on the roster, as he announced his retirement on November 9, 2018 after 15 seasons. His number 7 was retired on June 15, 2019. 

They improved upon their record from the previous season, and clinched the AL Central division for the first time since 2010 on September 25. On September 26, the Twins scored their 99th win with a victory over the Detroit Tigers, the highest number of wins for the franchise since 1965, and the third highest in franchise history. Despite winning 101 games (the second most since moving to Minnesota), the Twins were still the 3rd seed in the American League, the best record ever for a 3rd seed. With 307 home runs by their hitters, the Twins also set a new major league record for most home runs by a team in a season. They opened the playoffs by playing the New York Yankees in the Division Series, however they were swept 3 games to 0 in a best-of-5 series, extending their record for the longest playoff losing streak in MLB history to 16 games.

Regular season

Game log

|-style=background:#cfc
||1|| March 28 || Indians || 2–0 || Berríos (1–0) || Kluber (0–1) || Rogers (1) || 39,519 || 1–0 || W1
|-style=background:#fbb
||2|| March 30 || Indians || 1–2 || Edwards (1–0) || Parker (0–1) || Hand (1) || 15,271 || 1–1 || L1
|-style=background:#cfc
||3|| March 31 || Indians || 9–3 || Pérez (1–0) || Carrasco (0–1) || — || 15,613 || 2–1 || W1
|-style=background:#cfc
||4|| April 2 || @ Royals || 5–4 (10) || Hildenberger (1–0) || Boxberger (0–1) || Parker (1) || 10,024 || 3–1 || W2
|-style=background:#cfc
||5|| April 3 || @ Royals || 7–6 || May (1–0) || Peralta (0–1) || Parker (2) || 10,575 || 4–1 || W3
|-style=background:#fbb
||6|| April 5 || @ Phillies || 4–10 || Pivetta (1–0) || Odorizzi (0–1) || — || 28,021 || 4–2 || L1
|-style=background:#cfc
||7|| April 6 || @ Phillies || 6–2 || Pineda (1–0) || Arrieta (1–1) || — || 44,693 || 5–2 || W1
|-style=background:#fbb
||8|| April 7 || @ Phillies || 1–2 || Eflin (2–0) || Berríos (1–1) || Neris (1) || 39,735 || 5–3 || L1
|-style=background:#cfc
||9|| April 9 || @ Mets || 14–8 || Hildenberger (2–0) || deGrom (2–1) || — || 22,126 || 6–3 || W1
|-style=background:#fbb
||10|| April 10 || @ Mets || 6–9 || Syndergaard (1–1) || Odorizzi (0–2) || — || 20,946 || 6–4 || L1
|-style=background:#bbb
||—|| April 12 || Tigers || Colspan=7| Postponed (snow) (Makeup date: May 11.)
|-style=background:#cfc
||11|| April 13 || Tigers || 4–3 || Pineda (2–0) || Ross (1–2) || Parker (3) || 16,484 || 7–4 || W1
|-style=background:#cfc
||12|| April 14 || Tigers || 6–4 || Berríos (2–1) || Zimmermann (0–2) ||  Hildenberger (1) || 14,774 || 8–4 || W2
|-style=background:#fbb
||13|| April 15 || Blue Jays || 3–5 || Gaviglio (1–0) || Mejía (0–1) || Biagini (1) || 11,727 || 8–5 || L1
|-style=background:#fbb
||14|| April 16 || Blue Jays || 5–6 || Sanchez (2–1) || May (1–1) || Giles (5) || 13,365 || 8–6 || L2
|-style=background:#cfc
||15|| April 17 || Blue Jays || 4–1 || Odorizzi (1–2) || Thornton (0–2) || Parker (4) || 11,465 || 9–6 || W1
|-style=background:#fbb
||16|| April 18 || Blue Jays || 4–7 || Biagini (1–1) || Pineda (2–1) || Giles (6) || 12,523 || 9–7 || L1
|-style=background:#bbb
||-|| April 19 || @ Orioles || Colspan=7| Postponed (rain) (Makeup date: April 20.)
|-style=background:#cfc
||17|| April 20 || @ Orioles || 6–5 || Berríos (3–1) || Yacabonis (1–1) || Rogers (2) || — || 10–7 || W1
|-style=background:#cfc
||18|| April 20 || @ Orioles || 16–7 || Pérez (2–0) || Cobb (0–1) || — || 28,409 || 11–7 || W2
|-style=background:#cfc
||19|| April 21 || @ Orioles || 4–3 || Gibson (1–0) || Bundy (0–3) || Rogers (3) || 11,018 || 12–7 || W3
|-style=background:#cfc
||20|| April 22 || @ Astros || 9–5 || Odorizzi (2–2) || Peacock (2–1)  || — || 34,518 || 13–7 || W4
|-style=background:#fbb
||21|| April 23 || @ Astros || 4–10 || Rondón (2–0) || Hildenberger (2–1) || — || 29,409 || 13–8 || L1
|-style=background:#fbb
||22|| April 24 || @ Astros || 1–7 || Verlander (2–0) || Stewart (0–1) || — || 26,582 || 13–9 || L2
|-style=background:#cfc
||23|| April 26 || Orioles || 6–1 || Pérez (3–0) || Cobb (0–2) || — || 23,658 || 14–9 || W1
|-style=background:#cfc
||24|| April 27 || Orioles || 9–2 || Berríos (4–1) || Fry (0–1)  || — || 18,878 || 15–9 || W2
|-style=background:#cfc
||25|| April 28 || Orioles || 4–1 ||Gibson (2–0) || Bundy (0–4) || Parker (5) || 20,034 || 16–9 || W3
|-style=background:#cfc
||26|| April 29 || Astros || 1–0 || Odorizzi (3–2) || Verlander (4–1) || Parker (6) || 12,615 || 17–9 || W4
|-style=background:#fbb
||27|| April 30 || Astros || 0–11 || Cole (2–4)|| Pineda (2–2) || — || 12,181 || 17–10 || L1
|-

|-style=background:#cfc
||28|| May 1 || Astros || 6–2 || Pérez (4–0) || McHugh (3–3) || — || 14,115 || 18–10 || W1
|-style=background:#cfc
||29|| May 2 || Astros || 8–2 || Berríos (5–1) || Peacock (2–2) || — || 17,271 || 19–10 || W2
|-style=background:#fbb
||30|| May 3 || @ Yankees || 3–6 || Holder (2–0) || Gibson (2–1) ||Chapman (6)|| 35,911 || 19–11 || L1
|-style=background:#cfc
||31|| May 4 || @ Yankees || 7–3 || Odorizzi (4–2) || Happ (1–3) || — || 43,123 || 20–11 || W1
|-style=background:#fbb
||32|| May 5 || @ Yankees || 1–4  ||  Germán (6–1) || Pineda (2–3) || Chapman (7) || 38,603 || 20–12 || L1
|-style=background:#cfc
||33|| May 6 || @ Blue Jays || 8–0 || Pérez (5–0) || Stroman (1–5) || – || 12,292 || 21–12 || W1
|-style=background:#cfc
||34|| May 7 || @ Blue Jays || 3–0 || Berríos (6–1) || Sanchez (3–3) || Rogers (4) || 14,039 || 22–12 || W2
|-style=background:#cfc
||35|| May 8 || @ Blue Jays || 9–1 || Gibson (3–1) || Thornton (0–4) || — || 14,372 || 23–12 || W3
|-style=background:#cfc
||36|| May 10 || Tigers || 6–0 || Odorizzi (5–2) || Ross (1–5) || — || 26,789 || 24–12 || W4
|-style=background:#fbb
||37|| May 11 || Tigers || 3–5 || Jiménez (2–1) || Hildenberger (2–2) || Greene (14) || 28,840 || 24–13 || L1
|-style=background:#cfc
||38|| May 11 || Tigers || 8–3 || Stewart (1–1) || Soto (0–1) || || 20,724 || 25–13 || W1
|-style=background:#fbb
||39|| May 12 || Tigers || 3–5 || Norris (2–1) || Pérez (5–1) || Greene (15) || 27,373 || 25–14 || L1
|-style=background:#fbb
||40|| May 13 || Angels || 4–5 || Skaggs (4–3) || Berríos (6–2) || Robles (4) || 21,359 || 25–15 || L2
|-style=background:#cfc
| 41 || May 14 || Angels || 4–3 || Gibson (4–1) || Bedrosian (1–2) || Parker (7) || 26,747 || 26–15 || W1
|-style=background:#CFC
| 42 || May 15 || Angels || 8–7 || Odorizzi (6–2) || Cahill (2–4) || Morin (1) || 31,919 || 27–15 || W2
|-style=background:#cfc
||43|| May 16 || @ Mariners || 11–6 || Pineda (3–3) || Swanson (1–5) || — || 16,397 || 28–15 || W3
|-style=background:#cfc
||44|| May 17 || @ Mariners || 7–1 || Pérez (6–1) || Gonzales (5–3) || — || 20,268 || 29–15 || W4
|-style=background:#cfc
||45|| May 18 || @ Mariners || 18–4 || Duffey (1–0) || LeBlanc (2–1) || — || 34,433 || 30–15 || W5
|-style=background:#fbb
||46|| May 19 || @ Mariners || 4–7 || Kikuchi (3–1) || Gibson (4–2) || — || 31,068 || 30–16 || L1
|-style=background:#cfc
||47|| May 20 || @ Angels || 3–1 || Rogers (1–0) || Buttrey (2–2) || Parker (8) || 34,177 || 31–16 || W1
|-style=background:#cfc
||48|| May 21 || @ Angels || 8–3 || Pineda (4–3) || Bard (1–2) || — || 32,316 || 32–16 || W2
|-style=background:#bbb
||49|| May 22 || @ Angels || – || Colspan=7| Postponed (rain) (Makeup date: May 23.)
|-style=background:#cfc
||49|| May 23 || @ Angels || 16–7 || Pérez (7–1) || Harvey (2–4) || — || 30,992 || 33–16 || W3
|-style=background:#cfc
||50|| May 24 || White Sox || 11–4 || Berríos (7–2) || López (3–5) || — || 29,638 || 34–16 || W4
|-style=background:#cfc
||51|| May 25 ||White Sox|| 8–1 || Gibson (5–2) || Bañuelos (2–4) || — || 39,139 || 35–16 || W5
|-style=background:#cfc
||52|| May 26 || White Sox || 7–0 || Odorizzi (7–2) || Covey (0–4) || — || 39,913 || 36–16 ||W6
|-style=background:#fbb
||53|| May 27 || Brewers || 4–5 || Burnes (1–3) || Rogers (1–1) || Hader (13) || 29,167 || 36–17 || L1
|-style=background:#cfc
||54|| May 28 || Brewers || 5–3 || Magill (1–0) || Claudio (1–2) || Harper (1) || 27,120 || 37–17 || W1
|-style=background:#fbb
||55|| May 30 || @ Rays || 3–14 || Morton (6–0) || Pérez (7–2) || — || 8,076 || 37–18 || L1
|-style=background:#cfc
||56|| May 31 || @ Rays || 5–3 || Rogers (2–1) || Castillo (1–4) || — || 14,375 || 38–18 || W1
|-

|-style=background:#cfc
||57|| June 1 || @ Rays || 6–2 || Gibson (6–2) || Chirinos (6–2) || — || 14,381 || 39–18 || W2
|-style=background:#cfc
||58|| June 2 || @ Rays || 9–7 || Odorizzi (8–2) || Yarbrough (4–2) || Rogers (5) || 14,616 || 40–18 || W3
|-style=background:#fbb
||59|| June 4 || @ Indians || 2–5 || Bieber (5–2) || Smeltzer (0–1) || Hand (17) || 15,814 || 40–19 || L1
|-style=background:#fbb
||60|| June 5 || @ Indians || 7–9 || Wittgren (3–0) || Parker (0–2) || Hand (18) || 16,962 || 40–20 || L2
|-style=background:#cfc
||61|| June 6 || @ Indians || 5–4 || Berríos (8–2) || Bauer (4–6) || Rogers (6) || 15,350 || 41–20 || W1
|-style=background:#cfc
||62|| June 7 || @ Tigers || 6–3 || Harper (1–0) || Jiménez (2–4) || Parker (9) || 21,551 || 42–20 || W2
|-style=background:#fbb
||63|| June 8 || @ Tigers || 3–9 || Ramirez (2–0) || Gibson (6–3) || — || 26,818 || 42–21 || L1
|-style=background:#cfc
||64|| June 9 || @ Tigers || 12–2 || Odorizzi (9–2) || Carpenter (1–3) || — || 20,127 || 43–21 || W1
|-style=background:#cfc
||65|| June 11 || Mariners || 6–5 || Magill (2–0) || Brennan (2–5) || May (1) || 23,046 || 44–21 || W2
|-style=background:#fbb
||66|| June 12 || Mariners || 6–9 (10) || Bass (1–1) || Duffey (1–1) || Elías (6) || 25,909 || 44–22 || L1
|-style=background:#cfc
||67|| June 13 || Mariners || 10–5 || Harper (2–0) || Brennan (2–6) || — || 31,912 || 45–22 || W1
|-style=background:#cfc
||68|| June 14 || Royals || 2–0 || Gibson (7–3) || Diekman (0–4) || Rogers (7) || 38,898 || 46–22 || W2
|-style=background:#cfc
||69|| June 15 || Royals || 5–4 || Odorizzi (10–2) || Sparkman (1–3) || Rogers (8) || 39,267 || 47–22 || W3
|-style=background:#fbb
||70|| June 16 || Royals || 6–8 || López (1–6) || Pérez (7–3) || Kennedy (7) || 38,886 || 47–23 || L1
|-style=background:#fbb
||71|| June 17 || Red Sox || 0–2 || Porcello (5–6) || Berríos (8–3) || Brasier (7) || 27,970 || 47–24 || L2
|-style=background:#cfc
||72|| June 18 || Red Sox || 4–3 (17) || Littell (1–0) || Johnson (0–1) || — || 25,741 || 48–24 || W1
|-style=background:#fbb
||73|| June 19 || Red Sox || 4–9 || Rodríguez (8–4) || Gibson (7–4) || — || 31,835 || 48–25 || L1
|-style=background:#fbb
||74|| June 20 || @ Royals || 1–4 || Sparkman (2–3) || Odorizzi (10–3) || Kennedy (9) || 22,683 || 48–26 || L2
|-style=background:#bfb
||75|| June 21 || @ Royals || 8–7 || Harper (3–0) || Diekman (0–5) || Rogers (9) || 27,418 || 49–26 || W1
|-style=background:#bfb
||76|| June 22 || @ Royals || 5–3  || May (2–1) || Peralta (2–3) || Parker (10) || 28,504 || 50–26 || W2
|-style=background:#fbb
||77|| June 23 || @ Royals || 1–6 || Bailey (7–6) || Pineda (4–4) || McCarthy (1) || 21,257 || 50–27 || L1
|-style=background:#bfb
||78|| June 25 || Rays || 9–4 || Gibson (8–4) || Snell (4–7) || — || 31,963 || 51–27 || W1
|-style=background:#bfb
||79|| June 26 || Rays || 6–4 || May (3–1) || Morton (8–2) || Rogers (10) || 31,650 || 52–27 || W2
|-style=background:#fbb
||80|| June 27 || Rays || 2–5  || Yarbrough (7–3) || Harper (3–1) || — || 31,317 || 52–28 || L1
|-style=background:#fbb
||81|| June 28 || @ White Sox || 4–6 || Detwiler (1–0) || Berríos (8–4) || Colomé (17) || 28,218 || 52–29 || L2
|-style=background:#bfb
||82|| June 29 || @ White Sox || 10–3 || Pineda (5–4) || Nova (3–7) || — || 27,908 || 53–29 || W1
|-style=background:#fbb
||83|| June 30 || @ White Sox || 3–4 || Giolito (11–2) || Thorpe (0–1) || Álex Colomé (18) || 27,244 || 53–30 || L1
|-

|-style=background:#fbb
||84|| July 2 || @ A's || 6–8 || Mengden (3–1) || Odorizzi (10–4) || Hendriks (3) || 13,926 || 53–31 || L2
|-style=background:#bfb
||85|| July 3 || @ A's || 4–3  || Parker (1–2) || Treinen (2–3) || Rogers (11) || 31,570 || 54–31 || W1
|-style=background:#fbb
||86|| July 4 || @ A's || 2–7 || Wang (1–0) || Berríos (8–5) || — || 20,836 || 54–32 || L1
|-style=background:#bfb
||87|| July 5 || Rangers || 15–6 || Pérez (8–3) || Sampson (6–6) || — ||  38,073 || 55–32 || W1
|-style=background:#bfb
||88|| July 6 || Rangers || 7–4 || Pineda (6–4) || Chavez (3–4) || Rogers (12) || 36,969 || 56–32 || W2
|-style=background:#fbb
||89|| July 7 || Rangers || 1–4  || Kelley (4–2) || Mejía (0–2) || — || 35,495 || 56–33 || L1
|-style=background:#bbbfff
||-|| July 9 || colspan="8"|90th All-Star Game in Cleveland, OH
|-style=background:#bfb
||90|| July 12 || @ Indians || 5–3 || Littell (2–0) || Pérez (2–2) || Rogers (13) || 30,857 || 57–33 || W1
|-style=background:#bfb
||91|| July 13 || @ Indians || 6–2 || Odorizzi (11–4) || Bauer (8–7) || — || 32,277 || 58–33 || W2
|-style=background:#fbb
||92|| July 14 || @ Indians || 3–4 || Cimber (5–2) || May (3–2) || Hand (24) || 25,194 || 58–34 || L1
|-style=background:#fbb
||93|| July 16 || Mets || 2–3 || Avilán (2–0) || Pineda (6–5) || Díaz (21) || 28,712 || 58–35 || L2
|-style=background:#fbb
||94|| July 17 || Mets || 4–14 || Vargas (4–5) || May (3–3) || — || 35,124 || 58–36 || L3
|-style=background:#bfb
||95|| July 18 || A's || 6–3 || Gibson (9–4) || Petit (2–2) || Rogers (14) || 28,432 || 59–36 || W1
|-style=background:#fbb
||96|| July 19 || A's || 3–5 || Bassitt (7–4) || Harper (3–2) || Hendriks (7) || 31,082 || 59–37 || L1
|-style=background:#fbb
||97|| July 20 || A's || 4–5 || Treinen (3–3) || Rogers (2–2) || Hendriks (8) || 32,270 || 59–38 || L2
|-style=background:#bfb
||98|| July 21 || A's || 7–6 || Stewart (2–1) || Hendriks (4–1) || — || 34,070 || 60–38 || W1
|-style=background:#bfb
||99|| July 22 || Yankees || 8–6 || Thorpe (1–1) || Sabathia (5–5) || Rogers (15) || 34,627 || 61–38 || W2
|-style=background:#fbb
||100|| July 23 || Yankees || 12–14  || Chapman (3–2) || Stewart (2–2) || Green (1) || 32,470 || 61–39 || L1
|-style=background:#fbb
||101|| July 24 || Yankees || 7–10 || Cortes Jr. (4–0) || Odorizzi (11–5) || Chapman (26) || 40,127 || 61–40 || L2
|-style=background:#bfb
||102|| July 25 || @ White Sox || 10–3 || Berríos (9–5) || Giolito (11–5) || — || 22,087 || 62–40 || W1
|-style=background:#bfb
||103|| July 26 || @ White Sox || 6–2 || Pineda (7–5) || Cease (1–3) || — || 22,602 || 63–40 || W2
|-style=background:#fbb
||104|| July 27 || @ White Sox || 1–5 || Nova (6–9) || Pérez (8–4) || — || 34,085 || 63–41 || L1
|-style=background:#bfb
||105|| July 28 || @ White Sox || 11–1 || Gibson (10–4) || Covey (1–7) || — || 27,595 || 64–41 || W1
|-style=background:#bfb
||106|| July 30 || @ Marlins || 2–1 || Odorizzi (12–5) || Gallen (1–3) || Rogers (16) || 8,064 || 65–41 || W2
|-style=background:#bfb
||107|| July 31 || @ Marlins || 7–1 || Berríos (10–5) || Alcántara (4–10) || — ||  8,567 || 66–41 || W3
|-

|-style=background:#fbb
||108|| August 1 || @ Marlins || 4–5  || Brigham (1–0) || Stashak (0–1) || — || 10,390 || 66–42 || L1
|-style=background:#bfb
||109|| August 2 || Royals || 11–9 || May (4–3) || Lovelady (0–1) || Romo (18) || 32,341 || 67–42 || W1
|-style=background:#bfb
||110|| August 3 || Royals || 11–3 || Gibson (11–4) || Duffy (5–6) || — || 36,823 || 68–42 || W2
|-style=background:#bfb
||111|| August 4 || Royals || 3–0 || Smeltzer (1–1) || Keller (7–11) || Rogers (17) || 30,171 || 69–42 || W3
|-style=background:#bfb
||112|| August 5 || Braves || 5–3 || May (5–3) || Martin (0–3) || — || 26,722 || 70–42 || W4
|-style=background:#fbb
||113|| August 6 || Braves || 7–12 || Foltynewicz (3–5) || Berríos (10–6) || — || 36,721 || 70–43 || L1
|-style=background:#fbb
||114|| August 7 || Braves || 7–11 || Fried (13–4) || Perez (8–5) || — || 35,682 || 70–44 || L2
|-style=background:#fbb
||115|| August 8 || Indians || 5–7 || Clevinger (7–2) || Gibson (11–5) || Hand (29) || 32,517 || 70–45 || L3
|-style=background:#fbb
||116|| August 9 || Indians || 2–6 || Bieber (12–4) || Smeltzer (1–2) || — || 36,641 || 70–46 || L4
|-style=background:#bfb
||117|| August 10 || Indians || 4–1 || Odorizzi (13–5) || Plutko (4–3) || Rogers (18) || 35,268 || 71–46 || W1
|-style=background:#fbb
||118|| August 11 || Indians || 3–7  || Hand (5–3) || Rogers (2–3) || — || 37,849 || 71–47 || L1
|-style=background:#bfb
||119|| August 13 || @ Brewers || 7–5 || Duffey (2–1) || Pomeranz (2–10) || Romo (19) || 44,331 || 72–47 || W1
|-style=background:#fbb
||120|| August 14 || @ Brewers || 5–6 || Guerra (6–3) || Romo (2–1) || Albers (4) || 41,077 || 72–48 || L1
|-style=background:#bfb
||121|| August 15 || @ Rangers || 13–6 || Pineda (8–5) || Payano (1–2) || Smeltzer (1) || 20,494 || 73–48 || W1
|-style=background:#bfb
||122|| August 16 || @ Rangers || 4–3 || Duffey (3–1) || Minor (11–7) || Romo (20) || 24,742 || 74–48 || W2
|-style=background:#bfb
||123|| August 17 || @ Rangers || 12–7 || Duffey (4–1) || Jurado (6–9) || — || 30,136 || 75–48 || W3
|-style=background:#bfb
||124|| August 18 || @ Rangers || 6–3 || Dyson (5–1) || Clase (0–2) || Rogers (19) || 18,500 || 76–48 || W4
|-style=background:#fbb
||125|| August 19 || White Sox || 4–6 || Nova (9–9) || Gibson (11–6) || Colomé (24) || 25,564 || 76–49 || L1
|-style=background:#bfb
||126|| August 20 || White Sox || 14–4 || Pineda (9–5) || López (7–11) || — || 26,798 || 77–49 || W1
|-style=background:#fbb
||127|| August 21 || White Sox || 0–4 || Giolito (14–6) || Odorizzi (13–6) || — || 31,389 || 77–50 || L1
|-style=background:#fbb
||128|| August 23 || Tigers || 6–9 || VerHagen (4–2) || Berríos (10–7) || — || 31,238 || 77–51 || L2
|-style=background:#bfb
||129|| August 24 || Tigers || 8–5 || Gibson (12–6) || Jackson (3–7) || Rogers (20) || 39,429 || 78–51 || W1
|-style=background:#bfb
||130|| August 25 || Tigers || 7–4 || Pérez (9–5) || Boyd (6–10) || — || 32,892 || 79–51 || W2
|-style=background:#bfb
||131|| August 27 || @ White Sox || 3–1 || Pineda (10–5) || Giolito (14–7) || Rogers (21) || 12,175 || 80–51 || W3
|-style=background:#bfb
||132|| August 28 || @ White Sox || 8–2 || Odorizzi (14–6) || Detwiler (2–4) || — || 16,802 || 81–51 || W4
|-style=background:#bfb
||133|| August 29 || @ White Sox || 10–5 || Berríos (11–7) || Cease (3–7) || Dobnak (1) || 15,886 || 82–51 || W5
|-style=background:#bfb
||134|| August 30 || @ Tigers || 13–5 || Gibson (13–6) || Jackson (3–8) || — || 17,273 || 83–51 || W6
|-style=background:#fbb
||135|| August 31 || @ Tigers || 7–10 || Boyd (7–10) || Pérez (9–6) || — || 16,713 || 83–52 || L1
|-

|-style=background:#bfb
||136|| September 1 || @ Tigers || 8–3 || Pineda (11–5) || Turnbull (3–14) || — || 13,776 || 84–52 || W1
|-style=background:#bfb
||137|| September 2 || @ Tigers || 4–3 || Littell (3–0) || Farmer (5–6) || Rogers (22) || 14,614 || 85–52 || W2
|-style=background:#bfb
||138|| September 3 || @ Red Sox || 6–5 || Thorpe (2–1) || Porcello (12–11) || Rogers (23) || 35,429 || 86–52 || W3
|-style=background:#fbb
||139|| September 4 || @ Red Sox || 2–6 || Rodriguez (17–5) || Berríos (11–8) || Workman (11) || 35,218 || 86–53 || L1
|-style=background:#bfb
||140|| September 5 || @ Red Sox || 2–1 || Pérez (10–6) || Cashner (11–8) || Rogers (24) || 32,632 || 87–53 || W1
|-style=background:#fbb
||141|| September 6 || Indians || 2–6  || Clippard (1–0) || Thorpe (2–2) || — || 35,418 || 87–54 || L1
|-style=background:#bfb
||142|| September 7 || Indians || 5–3 || Littell (4–0) || Cimber (5–3) || Rogers (25) || 39,573 || 88–54 || W1
|-style=background:#fbb
||143|| September 8 || Indians || 2–5 || Clevinger (11–2) || Dobnak (0–1) || Hand (34) || 31,380 || 88–55 || L1
|-style=background:#bfb
||144|| September 10 || Nationals || 5–0 || Berríos (12–8) || Sánchez (8–8) || — || 24,813 || 89–55 || W1
|-style=background:#fbb
||145|| September 11 || Nationals || 2–6 || Strasburg (17–6) || Pérez (10–7) || — || 20,062 || 89–56 || L1
|-style=background:#fbb
||146|| September 12 || Nationals || 6–12 || Corbin (12–7) || Gibson (13–7) || — || 19,167 || 89–57 || L2
|-style=background:#bbb
||—|| September 13 || @ Indians || – ||  Colspan=7| Postponed (rain) (Makeup date: September 14.)
|-style=background:#bfb
||147|| September 14 || @ Indians || 2–0 || Littell (5–0) || Clevinger (11–3) || Rogers (26) || 24,258 || 90–57 || W1
|-style=background:#bfb
||148|| September 14 || @ Indians || 9–5 || Graterol (1–0) || Pérez (2–3) || — || 31,841 || 91–57 || W2
|-style=background:#fbb
||149|| September 15 || @ Indians || 5–7 || Wittgren (5–1) || Romero (0–1) || Pérez (1) || 26,414 || 91–58 || L1
|-style=background:#bfb
||150|| September 16 || White Sox || 5–3 || Berríos (13–8) || López (9–14) || Rogers (27) || 21,850 || 92–58 || W1
|-style=background:#bfb
||151|| September 17 || White Sox || 9–8 (12) || Harper (4–2) || Ruiz (1–4) || — || 22,518 || 93–58 || W2
|-style=background:#fbb
||152|| September 18 || White Sox || 1–3 || Fry (3–4) || Odorizzi (14–7) || Colomé (28) || 23,759 || 93–59 || L1
|-style=background:#bfb
||153|| September 19 || Royals || 8–5 || Thorpe (3–2) || Barnes (1–3) || Rogers (28) || 24,565 || 94–59 || W1
|-style=background:#bfb
||154|| September 20 || Royals || 4–3 || Dobnak (1–1) || Skoglund (0–2) || May (2) || 29,468 || 95–59 || W2
|-style=background:#fbb
||155|| September 21 || Royals || 5–12 || Rosario (2–0) || Rogers (2–4) || — || 37,750 || 95–60 || L1
|-style=background:#bfb
||156|| September 22 || Royals || 12–8 || Littell (6–0) || López (4–9) || — || 31,628 || 96–60 || W1
|-style=background:#bfb
||157|| September 24 || @ Tigers || 4–2 || Odorizzi (15–7) || Turnbull (3–16) || Rogers (29) || 16,174 || 97–60 || W2
|-style=background:#bfb
||158|| September 25 || @ Tigers || 5–1 || Dobnak (2–1) || VerHagen (4–3) || — || 16,242 || 98–60 || W3
|-style=background:#bfb
||159|| September 26 || @ Tigers || 10–4 || Smeltzer (2–2)  || Zimmermann (1–13)  || — ||17,557|| 99–60 || W4
|-style=background:#bfb
||160|| September 27 || @ Royals || 6–2  || Berríos (14–8) || Skoglund (0–3) || — || 15,389 || 100–60 || W5
|-style=background:#bfb
||161|| September 28 || @ Royals || 4–3 || Duffey (5–1) || Barnes (1–5) || Rogers (30) || 21,995 || 101–60 || W6
|-style=background:#fbb
||162|| September 29 || @ Royals || 4–5 || Kennedy (3–2) || Graterol (1–1) || — || 17,875 || 101-61 || L1
|-

|- style="text-align:center;"
| Legend:       = Win       = Loss       = PostponementBold = Twins Team Member

Postseason

Game log

|- style=background:#fbb;"
| 1 || October 4 || @ Yankees || 4–10 || Green (1–0) || Littell (0–1) || — || 49,233 || 0–1 || L1
|- style=background:#fbb;"
| 2 || October 5 || @ Yankees || 2–8 || Tanaka (1–0) || Dobnak (0–1) || — || 49,277 || 0–2 || L2
|- style=background:#fbb;"
| 3 || October 7 || Yankees || 1–5 || Green (2–0) || Odorizzi (0–1) || Chapman (1) || 41,121 || 0–3 || L3
|-

Postseason rosters

| style="text-align:left" |
Pitchers: 12 Jake Odorizzi 17 José Berríos 21 Tyler Duffey 31 Devin Smeltzer 44 Kyle Gibson 51 Brusdar Graterol 52 Zack Littell 54 Sergio Romo 55 Taylor Rogers 61 Cody Stashak 65 Trevor May 68 Randy Dobnak 
Catchers: 15 Jason Castro 18 Mitch Garver 
Infielders: 2 Luis Arráez 9 Marwin González 11 Jorge Polanco 13 Ehire Adrianza 16 Jonathan Schoop 22 Miguel Sanó 24 C. J. Cron 
Outfielders: 20 Eddie Rosario 26 Max Kepler 60 Jake Cave 
Designated hitters: 23 Nelson Cruz
|- valign="top"

Season standings

Records vs. AL Opponents

Roster

Farm System

References

External links
2019 Minnesota Twins season at Baseball Reference

2019
2019 Major League Baseball season
2019 in sports in Minnesota
2019